The Alabama Department of Public Safety is the uniform section of the Alabama Law Enforcement Agency, serving the U.S. state of Alabama. It is made up of three divisions: Highway Patrol Division, Marine Patrol Division, and Drivers' License Division.

History

The Alabama Department of Public Safety began as the Alabama Highway Patrol on December 5, 1935.  The Highway Patrol was renamed the Department of Public Safety on March 8, 1939, and then included 4 divisions: Highway Patrol, Driver License, Accident Prevention Bureau, and Mechanical and Equipment.

On January 17, 2011, Hugh B. McCall was appointed to the position of Colonel of the Alabama Department of Public Safety by Governor Robert J. Bentley, making him the first African-American to head the agency. In 2013 the state's law enforcement agencies were streamlined into the Alabama Law Enforcement Agency.

Organization
The Department of Public Safety is headed by a director appointed by the Governor of Alabama who is the executive officer of the department and holds the rank of colonel. The director is aided in managing the department by an assistant director, who is also appointed by the governor and who holds the rank of lieutenant colonel. Each of the department's three divisions are headed by uniformed officers with the rank of major.

Driver License Division
Drive License Examining Unit
Drive Records Unit
License Reinstatement Unit
Safety Responsibility Unit
Alabama Highway Patrol Division
Career Development and Training Office
 Motor Carrier Safety Unit
Traffic Homicide Investigations Office
Division Programs Office
Patrol Operations
Alexander City Post
Birmingham Post
Decatur Post
Dothan Post
Eufaula Field Office
Evergreen Post
Gadsden Post
Grove Hill Field Office
Hamilton Post
Huntsville Post
Jacksonville Post
Mobile Post
Montgomery Post
Opelika Post
Quad Cities Post
Selma Post
Troy Post
Tuscaloosa Post
–

Highway Patrol

The Alabama Highway Patrol is a division of the Alabama Department of Public Safety and is the highway patrol agency for Alabama, which has jurisdiction anywhere in the state. It was created to protect the lives, property and constitutional rights of people in Alabama.

In 1971, the Alabama Highway Patrol became the first U.S. police organization to use downsized vehicles for regular highway patrol duties when they purchased 132 AMC Javelins. This pre-dated, among others, the Camaros and Mustangs used by other departments years later.

Marine Patrol
The Alabama Marine Patrol Division is responsible for law enforcement on the waterways of Alabama. The mission of the Division is to "enhance safety and promote responsible use of resources on Alabama's waterways through enforcement, education, and community activities". The Division patrols the waterways of the state, oversees pleasure boats registration and boat operators licensing, and provides education to boaters, and also maintains 1,518 waterway markings (buoys).

The Division operates from three districts: Northern, which includes the Tennessee, Coosa, and Black Warrior Rivers; Central, which includes the Coosa, Tallapoosa, Alabama, Tombigbee, and Chattahoochee Rivers; and Southern, which includes the Alabama and Tombigbee Rivers, Mobile Bay, Gulf of Mexico, and other rivers and lakes.

Rank structure
The Alabama Department of Public Safety rank structure is as listed:

Fallen officers
There have been 29 Alabama State Troopers killed in the line of duty since its beginning in 1935.

Since 1935, the Alabama State Troopers have had one Trooper killed in the military.

References

External links
 https://web.archive.org/web/20180127084317/http://dps.alabama.gov/Home/Default.aspx

State law enforcement agencies of Alabama
Government agencies established in 1935
State Bureaus of Investigation
1935 establishments in Alabama